Worthen with Shelve is a civil parish in Shropshire, England.  It contains 88 listed buildings that are recorded in the National Heritage List for England.  Of these, one is listed at Grade I, the highest of the three grades, four are at Grade II*, the middle grade, and the others are at Grade II, the lowest grade.  The parish contains two contrasting regions.  The region to the northwest is mainly rural, and contains villages and smaller settlements, including Worthen, Aston Pigott, and Brockton.  In this region, most of the listed buildings are houses, cottages, farmhouses and farm buildings, many of which are timber framed.  The region also includes churches, public houses, a country house and associated structures, a bridge, milestones, pumps, and a war memorial.  The southeast region is more hilly and during the 19th century was an important area for lead mining, particularly the area around Snailbeach.  Some of the areas containing the former lead mines are designated as scheduled monuments.  The listed buildings relating to the lead mining industry include chimneys, engine houses, and winding engine houses, some of which are in ruins, and a locomotive shed.


Key

Buildings

References

Citations

Sources

Lists of buildings and structures in Shropshire